State Road 607 (SR 607) is a state highway that extends  from its southern terminus (an intersection with SR 614 near Lakewood Park) to the Indian River County line. A north–south road in northern St. Lucie County and southern Indian River County, it is locally known as Emerson Avenue throughout its route.

SR 607 formerly extended into Indian River County, with its northern terminus being at Vero Beach.

Route description
SR 607's two north–south lanes pass through orange groves in St. Lucie County.

History
According to a 1960 map prepared by State Road Department (forerunner of the Florida Department of Transportation), Emerson Road shared its SR 607 designation with Indrio Road (present SR 614) and Kings Highway (present SR 713). At that time, Angle Road east of Kings Highway was signed State Road 607A.

This portion threads between residential developments and is an important commuter road for this growing section of the eastern coast of Florida.

Prior to 1978, SR 607 was a primary access road for the local orange groves, once the primary source of commerce of the region (and still a significant industry).  Between 1978 and 1980, it served to "bridge the gap" between the incomplete Interstate 95 (SR 9) and Florida's Turnpike in Indian River and St. Lucie counties.  Southbound motorists would exit I-95 at the temporary southern end at SR 60 (Osceola Boulevard/20th Street) west of Vero Beach, travel southward the length of SR 607, then right one mile (1.6 km) on SR 614 (Indrio Road) before going south the remaining  on SR 713 (Kings Highway) to SR 70 (Okeechobee Road) and a trumpet interchange with the Turnpike in Fort Pierce.

Major intersections

References

External links

607
607
607